Devon Sandoval (born June 16, 1991) is an American former professional soccer player who played as a forward.

Early career
The son of Diana and Greg Sandoval and native of Albuquerque, Sandoval attended Eldorado High School in New Mexico, where he played soccer.  He continued his education and soccer career at San Diego State University, but remained there only until his freshman year.  He then transferred to the University of New Mexico, where he would spend the remainder of his three college years.

Professional career

Major League Soccer 
Sandoval was selected by Real Salt Lake in the second round (29th overall) of the 2013 MLS SuperDraft. On March 3, 2013, Sandoval made his professional soccer debut with Real Salt Lake against the San Jose Earthquakes in their opening day game for the 2013 Major League Soccer season.  He came on as a substitute in the 87th minute for the Man of the Match, Álvaro Saborío, who scored two goals to lead the club to a 2–0 victory. He scored his first goal for Salt Lake in an away game against the New England Revolution on May 8, 2013. During a Lamar Hunt U.S. Open Cup round match against the NASL's (North American Soccer League) Atlanta Silverbacks in Rio Tinto Stadium on May 28, 2013, Sandoval scored an overtime goal, assisted by teammates Javier Morales and Joao Plata to help Real Salt Lake clinch a 3–2 victory and advanced to the fourth round of the tournament. On June 12, 2013, Sandoval scored twice (once in overtime) against the Charleston Battery to help Real Salt Lake win 5–2 and advance to the Lamar Hunt U.S. Open Cup quarterfinals. With Alvaro Saborio injured, Sandoval got the start in RSL's home leg against the Portland Timbers in the 2013 Western Conference Finals, and scored the team's third goal on an assist from Robbie Findley. RSL won the game 4–2.

Sandoval was sent on a two-game loan deal to NASL club Carolina RailHawks on September 10, 2014. On May 22, 2015, Sandoval won MLS Goal of the Week for a goal scored against the Montreal Impact on May 16, 2015. On 13 July 2016, Sandoval was loaned to Rayo OKC, where he played the NASL Autumn Regular Season and Playoffs.  Sandoval and Rayo OKC advanced to the NASL semi-finals before losing to the eventual NASL Champions, New York Cosmos.

On January 30, 2017, the San Francisco Deltas of the NASL announced Sandoval had signed with the team.  On February 15, 2017 Sandoval scored the winning goal in the Delta's pre-season 1–0 win over the MLS San Jose Earthquakes. On November 12, 2017, Sandoval was subbed into the 90th minute in the 2017 NASL finals against the New York Cosmos. Sandoval would go on to score a late goal in stoppage time to put the Deltas up 2–0, over the Cosmos.

On March 22, 2018, Sandoval joined Atlanta United 2 of the United Soccer League.

New Mexico United 
On June 6, 2018, Sandoval was named as the first player to sign with the newly formed USL side New Mexico United ahead of their inaugural 2019 season. On March 9, 2019, he scored the team's first-ever goal in their opening match against Fresno FC.

On October 10, 2019, Sandoval was voted the USL Championship Player of the Month for September. 

Sandoval announced his retirement from professional soccer on January 17, 2023.

Career statistics

References

External links

University of New Mexico profile

1991 births
Living people
American soccer players
San Diego State Aztecs men's soccer players
New Mexico Lobos men's soccer players
Real Salt Lake players
North Carolina FC players
Real Monarchs players
Rayo OKC players
San Francisco Deltas players
Association football forwards
University of New Mexico alumni
Real Salt Lake draft picks
Major League Soccer players
North American Soccer League players
USL Championship players
Soccer players from Albuquerque, New Mexico
New Mexico United players